Feels Like is a 2015 album by Bully.

Feels Like may also refer to:

 "Feels Like", a 2021 song by Gracie Abrams from the album This Is What It Feels Like
 "Feels Like", a 2022 song by Lucky Daye from the album Candydrip
 "Feels Like", a 2013 song by Peking Duk
 "Feels Like..." a 2017 song by Ho99o9 from the album United States of Horror
 "Feels like", a term used by heat indexes

See also
 This Is What It Feels Like (disambiguation)